Asaccus zagrosicus is a species of leaf-toed gecko endemic to Iran. The holotype was collected in 2008 in southern Lorestan in the Tang-e-Haft Region between the central Zagros Mountains and Khuzestan Plain.

Males were slightly longer than females. Females were gravid in spring and summer.

This species of Asaccus feeds on small insects including larva. It was observed as active at night and during the day, only inside of tunnels in the Tang-e-Haft region. Other reptiles co-occurring with Asaccus zagrosicus were Hemidactylus sp., Cyrtopodion scabrum, and Pseudocerastes persicus fieldi.

References

Asaccus
Reptiles of Iran
Endemic fauna of Iran
Reptiles described in 2011